The New Zealand women's rugby union team, called the Black Ferns, represents New Zealand in women's international rugby union, which is regarded as the country's national sport. The team has won six out of nine Women's Rugby World Cup tournaments.

They have an 85 per cent winning record in Test match rugby, and are the only women's international side with a winning record against every opponent. Since their official international debut in 1990, the Black Ferns have lost to only four of the sixteen nations they have played against — They are England, France, Ireland, and the United States. They have never been ranked lower than second in the World Rankings since its introduction in 2003. The team performs a Haka before every match; this is a Māori challenge or posture dance. Traditionally the Black Ferns use the Haka Ko Uhia Mai until the present year.

History 
Women's rugby in New Zealand was rising in the late eighties, but recognition and assistance from New Zealand Rugby Football Union (NZRFU) wasn't available. It wasn't until 1989 that women's rugby started to get official recognition with the organisation of matches by provinces and clubs. On July 22 that year, New Zealand fielded their first women's rugby union team against a touring United States side, the California Grizzlies.

Team's name 
The team's name refers to the Mamaku, the black tree fern, which is a taonga (treasure) of Aotearoa. It also aligns with the colour black and the silver fern, which are iconic New Zealand sporting symbols. For example, the All Blacks is New Zealand's men's rugby team, the Black Caps is the men's cricket team, the White Ferns is the women's cricket team, while the Silver Ferns is the women's netball team.

World Cup wins 
The Black Ferns have participated in most Rugby World Cup events since its inauguration in 1991, only missing the 1994 championship in Scotland. Starting with the inaugural International Rugby Board (IRB)-sponsored tournament in 1998, the Black Ferns have gone on to win five more titles — including the 2002, 2006, 2010, 2017, and the 2021 tournament which was hosted in New Zealand.

Funding 
While rugby is the most popular spectator game in New Zealand, the Black Ferns have suffered in the past from similar problems to any women's sport: under-funding, lack of support and lack of publicity. While the New Zealand Rugby Union (NZRU) and World Rugby have been criticised to an extent for not doing more to promote women's rugby, support is beginning to improve in those organisations, in large part due to the Ferns' successes. 

The NZRU started funding the Black Ferns in 1995, therefore giving a great boost to their game, while the Black Ferns have benefitted from being included in NZRU High Performance initiatives. Along with professional coaches, the team has had access to professional development resources such as analysis. In more recent times, the team's profile has risen greatly at a grassroots level, due in great part to their string of successes, and it is increasingly seen to be a national team on the same basis as any other.

Provincial championship 
In January 2010, the Women's Provincial Championship (WPC) came under severe threat after the NZRU announced that it would be shut down due to budget cuts. As the championship was a prime builder of training, skill and competition for New Zealand women's rugby, the decision was a shock for players and supporters, including former captain Farah Palmer - especially since it was a World Cup year. 

While NZRU said women's domestic rugby was one of many victims of the tight financial times, they faced widespread criticism for their decision. After the Black Ferns' 2010 World Cup victory, the NZRU immediately apologised and reinstated the WPC, which was renamed the Farah Palmer Cup in 2016 in honour of the Black Ferns' influential former captain.

International competitions 
The Black Ferns have also won the Canada Cup in 1996, 2000, and 2005, and the Churchill Cup in 2004. From 2002 until their last game of 2009, the Black Ferns enjoyed a streak of 24 consecutive test match wins.

In 2018, after the success of the New Zealand women's national rugby sevens team, all Sevens and Black Ferns players have been offered semi-professional contracts. They also played the first Test series against Australian Wallaroos, which was played on the same night as the Men's Bledisloe Cup Tests.

The 2018 season finished with a 1–1 drawn series against France, with France becoming only the fourth team in the world to beat the Black Ferns. The Black Ferns' loss in the final game of the year ended a 17-month long winning streak and was also the final game for captain Fa’amausili, who retired from international rugby.

In 2019, the Black Ferns won the annual Women's Rugby Super Series for the second time. On 31 October 2021, the Black Ferns played their 100th test match against England at Exeter. They hosted the 2022 Pacific Four Series and won their first title after going undefeated in the series.

New Zealand hosted the delayed 2021 Rugby World Cup after beating out neighbour Australia for the rights. New Zealand automatically qualified for the 2021 event as host.

Haka 

The Black Ferns perform a haka (a Māori challenge) before every international match. Until the present year, the Black Ferns performed the haka Ko Uhia Mai, specially composed by the respected Māori rugby leader, Te Whetū Tipiwai.

Record 

The first four games listed below – played at RugbyFest 1990 – are not generally accepted as being internationals by New Zealand authorities. However, in men's rugby it is general practice to award full international status to any games where ONE side considers a game to be an international. As a result all games in that tournament have been treated as full internationals in this article.

Overall 
 (Full internationals only, updated to 13 November 2022)

Rugby World Cup 

New Zealand have won the World Cup six times. They lost to eventual winners the United States in the semi-final of the inaugural competition held in Wales in 1991, but were absent from the following tournament in 1994, due to the late cancellation of the event. They defeated the United States in the final of the 1998 World Cup held in the Netherlands to claim their maiden title. They followed this up with three more consecutive titles, overcoming England in the final of the next three editions; 2002, 2006 and 2010, as well as in their fifth world title in 2017. They won their sixth World Title after defeating England 34-31 in the 2021 Rugby World Cup Grand Final.

In the 2014 Rugby World Cup, they lost a pool game to Ireland, while the top two teams in another pool drew their match. This saw them miss out on the semi-finals by a single table point, before going on to heavily defeat Wales and the United States to finish the tournament in fifth.

Players

Current squad
32-Player Squad for the 2021 Rugby World Cup, hosted in New Zealand for the first time. Grace Brooker, Kaipo Olsen-Baker, and Aleisha Pearl Nelson were unavailable for selection due to injury.

Caps Updated To: 13 November 2022

Notable players 

Four former Black Ferns have been inducted into the World Rugby Hall of Fame: Farah Palmer, Anna Richards, Huriana Manuel-Carpenter and Fiao'o Fa'amausili.

Farah Palmer won three Women's Rugby World Cups, in 1998, 2002 and 2006. During her captaincy from 1997 to 2006, the Black Ferns lost only once. Palmer made her international debut against Australia in August 1996. She earned 35 caps, making her the fifth-most capped Black Ferns player. Palmer was awarded the IRB International Women's Personality of the Year in 2005. For the 5th Women's Rugby World Cup in Canada, Palmer fought her way back into the team and again led them to World Cup victory. After the win, she announced her retirement from the Black Ferns in September 2006. The national provincial women's competition in New Zealand is named in her honour in recognition of her contribution to the game. She was inducted into World Rugby's Hall of Fame in October 2014.

Anna Richards was inducted into World Rugby's Hall of Fame in October 2014 along with Palmer. She won 49 caps for the Black Ferns in a career that spanned two decades, from 1990 to 2010. She played in the inaugural 1991 World Cup when New Zealand lost in the semi-finals. Richards is also a four-time Women's Rugby World Cup winner – 1998, 2002, 2006 and 2010; she played in every final.

Huriana Manuel-Carpenter represented New Zealand in both sevens and 15s. In 2013, she captained the Black Ferns sevens side when they won the inaugural Women's Sevens Series title and the Sevens World Cup. She was also captain when the side successfully defended the series title in 2014. She won a silver medal at the Rio Olympic Games. Manuel-Carpenter is also a two-time Rugby World Cup winner – 2006 and 2010. Between 2005 and 2014 she scored 15 tries from 25 test appearances. She is part of the first mother-and-daughter duo to have played for the Black Ferns. She was inducted into World Rugby's Hall of Fame in October 2021.

Fiao'o Fa'amausili was the most capped Black Fern at the time of her retirement in 2018. She recorded 50 wins from 58 games with 35 tests as captain. She scored 17 tries, the most by a forward, and won four World Cups out of the five that she has attended.

Previous squads

Coaches
All Head Coaches of the Black Ferns (1991–Present). Every Black Fern coach has been a New Zealander.

(Full internationals only, updated to 13 November 2022)

See also
List of women's international rugby union test matches – the most complete listing of all women's international results since 1982.

Further reading

Notes

References

External links 
 

 
national
New Zealand
Women's national rugby union teams